Songs for the Late Night Drive Home is the third studio album from American singer-songwriter Anchor & Braille. Tooth & Nail Records released the album on February 5, 2016, as their second release with the label.

Critical reception

Songs for the Late Night Drive Home received generally positive reviews from music critics. Craig Ismaili, allocating the album an 8.0 review at AbsolutePunk, says, "it's one of the many things that keeps me coming back to the record again and again." Awarding the album four stars from Jesus Freak Hideout, Roger Gelwicks writes, "Anchor & Braille puts forth a serene and engaging journey with Songs for the Late Night Drive Home, and it's an eclectic early favorite for the year." Christopher Smith, rating the album three and a half stars for Jesus Freak Hideout, describes, "Songs For The Late Night Drive Home is more than just a great name for a playlist, it is an alluring, thoughtful and cohesive musical experience." Giving the album four stars from Jesus Freak Hideout, Scott Fryberger states, "Christian's latest solo venture finds the artist surrounding his signature vocals with an electronic array of soothing soundscapes that really make you want to take a late night drive for no other reason than to listen to this while you do it." Jonathan J. Francesco, allotting the album four stars at New Release Today, says, "This is not Anberlin. But it is another side of master musician Stephen Christian, and virtually anything that guy sings is worth your time." Indicating in a 90 percent review at Jesus Wired, Billy Praise writes, "no matter the personal issues and qualms I may have, it’s an undeniable fact that very few albums live up to their names or the reason for which they were created. Stephen Christian has done just that and more". Luke Nuttall, signaling in a three and a half star review by Already Heard, states, "'Songs For The Late Night Drive Home’ is a surprisingly slick and well-executed album."

Track listing

Chart performance

References

2016 albums
Anchor & Braille albums
Tooth & Nail Records albums